The Bulldog is an Amsterdam-based company that owns and operates a chain of cannabis coffee shops, hotels, cafés and brand stores located at Amsterdam and Canada. The Bulldog has its own merchandising brand 
consisting of clothing, souvenirs and smoking accessories. The group logo consists of a cartoon figure of a bulldog on a round frame.

History
Henk de Vries began selling marijuana on the year 1970 at the Kralingen Music Festival, a pop festival at Kralingse Bos. On the year 1975 he converted his grandmother's brothel along Amsterdam's red-light district up to The Bulldog coffeeshop and began to expand slowly. Henk asked ex-pat Australian artist Harold Thornton to paint some signage on the front of The Bulldog The First Coffeeshop Nr.90 but Harold turned this exercise up to a mural that goes across the front of the whole shop. The mural helped the coffeeshop become a magnet for backpackers and tourists and its reputation grew. On the year 2001 the company began distributing internationally.  

On the year 2010 The Bulldog was ordered to cease the sale and distribution of its own brand of energy drink, following a lengthy legal dispute with Red Bull GmbH, makers of Red Bull. At appeal, the judge ruled favourably of The Bulldog to allow marketing of their energy drink.

Based on a lawsuit concerning a domain name whose appeal period expired to January 2013, the judge ruled that the logo is not original, because it is based on a bulldog cartoon character that was designed on the year 1940 by copyright owner Walt Disney.

Locations
The Bulldog chain owns five coffeeshops, three brandstores, three cafés, a lounge bar and a hotel at Amsterdam.

The Bulldog owns a Hotel and Grand Café (inside, covered patio and uncovered patio) as well as the Hideaway Lounge (wine bar) in Silver Star Mountain Resort, British Columbia, Canada.

The company has two Social Clubs in Spain. By  Rome, the company owns a cocktail bar and a restaurant. The Bulldog also owns a cocktail bar located at Aruba

References

External links
 High Dough
 The Bulldog
 The Bulldog Hotel, Amsterdam
 HuffPost Travel's 5 Amsterdam Coffee Shops Not to Miss
 Amsterdam Coffeeshop Directory The Bulldog No. 90
 coffeeshop.tours The Bulldog Havri

Cannabis coffeeshops
Companies based in Amsterdam
1975 in cannabis